Gromia sphaerica is a large spherical testate amoeba, a single-celled eukaryotic organism and the largest of its genus, Gromia. The genus itself contains about 13 known species, 3 of which have been recently discovered. The test (organic shell) is usually spherical in shape and honeycombed with pores. There are filaments on the bottom of the organism, where it is in contact with the seafloor, and it is mostly filled with stercomata (waste pellets).

In 2008,  specimens were found off the coast of Little San Salvador in the Bahamas by researchers from the University of Texas. It was previously thought that single-celled organisms were incapable of making these kinds of trails, and their cause was previously a source of speculation. The mud trails made by the Bahamian Gromia appear to match prehistoric mud trails from the Precambrian, including 1.8 billion year-old fossil trails in the Stirling formation in Australia. Because the tracks of Gromia resemble the 1.8 billion year old traces that were believed to represent the traces of complex bilaterian worms, said tracks could have been a result of similarly giant single-celled organisms instead of complex animals.

Description
G. sphaerica mainly resembled a grape in size and in body appearance. When the sediment was removed from one of the specimens, it showed that the skin was similar to that of a grapes skin, but much softer when touched.

Tracks
The tracks that G. sphaerica makes on the muddy sea floor are similar to the tracks of animals from the Ediacaran period. In some of the photos, the tracks can be seen as being curved.

References

External links

Endomyxa
Amoeboids